Death Wish is a 1972 novel by Brian Garfield. A sequel novel, Death Sentence, was published in 1975.

Plot
Paul Benjamin is a forty-seven year old CPA who lives in Manhattan with his wife Esther in an apartment close to their daughter, Carol, and her husband Jack Tobey. Paul is a staunch liberal, volunteering his time to civic organizations, being generous and compassionate, and trying to rationalize the crime and misery he witnesses on a daily basis. He refuses to move out of the city, explaining that while the suburbs might be safer and cleaner, he can't leave New York after having lived there his entire life.

One day, Paul gets a call at work from Jack telling him to come to the hospital. There, a patrolman explains that three junkies broke into Paul's apartment and assaulted Esther and Carol, beating the former to death before stealing Paul's television and fleeing. Carol is still alive, but in a vegetative state where she can no longer meaningfully interact with anyone. After his wife's funeral, Paul begins to undergo an emotional and personal transformation. He refuses to leave his apartment, has new locks put on the doors, and starts carrying a club made from a sock stuffed with quarters in his pocket. He also sheds his previous beliefs; everyone he sees is now either a potential criminal or unproductive, useless "cattle". Paul gradually aligns himself with the conservative viewpoints of his co-workers, unnerving them.

The sudden changes in his personality and behavior also alienate Paul from his son-in-law, who disagrees with Paul's contention that since the police aren't making any headway with Esther's case, they ought to hunt down her murderers themselves. Jack points out that vigilantism is not a real solution to crime, and that Paul isn't doing himself any favors by obsessing over what happened to her. When Paul asks for help obtaining a permit so he can carry a gun, Jack refuses. Paul appears to give in, returning to his old job and even accepting a dinner invitation from his friend Sam.

One night while walking home drunk, Paul is threatened with a knife by a teenage boy. Overcome with rage, Paul pulls out his club and tries to kill the boy, who runs away in sheer terror. The experience changes Paul; he decides that he won't "let those animals run him out of his own town anymore", and accepts an offer from his boss to go to Tucson to work on a business merger between two rival companies. He sleeps with a woman named Shirley whom he meets in a bar, and visits a sporting goods shop, where he purchases a .32 Smith & Wesson revolver and smuggles it back into New York along with a large stash of ammunition.

Jack calls his father-in-law, revealing that Carol's condition has deteriorated to the point where she can no longer feed, wash, or take care of herself; Paul reluctantly signs off on Jack's plan to have her placed in a mental institution; he then purchases a jacket, hat, and gloves and starts looking for criminals, deliberately presenting himself as a harmless, affluent old man in order to attract attention. After initially finding no good targets, Paul is held up by a junkie, and shoots him three times. Over the next few weeks, Paul keeps up the pretense of being his usual self by going to work and attending social events while discreetly continuing his vigilante activities; he shoots another mugger and a man he catches burglarizing an apartment. He also tries more sophisticated tactics, renting a car and leaving it unoccupied with a sign reading "Out of Gas" on the windshield. When two thieves show up to strip the car for parts, Paul shoots them both. 

Paul's actions lead to him being dubbed "the vigilante" in the press, and divides the public over whether his killings are justified. The police declare him a menace, and a magazine runs an article where a psychiatrist accurately describes Paul's motivations and personal history, and states that if he is insane, it's because he's acting against social norms that prevent ordinary people from acting on their base desires for revenge. One night, Paul shoots at a group of young men and women throwing bricks and rocks at a subway train. While hunting for his quarry, a beat cop stumbles onto the scene and recognizes Paul as the vigilante. Unwilling to commit suicide, Paul is about to surrender when the cop suddenly tips his hat and walks away. The story then ends with Paul finishing his work and quietly heading home.

Characters
Paul Benjamin – The protagonist. An aging accountant and "bleeding-heart" liberal, Paul slowly begins to turn to vigilantism after his family is brutally mugged. Having served in World War II as a clerk-typist, he has military training and quickly becomes an effective killer.
Esther Benjamin – Paul's wife; little is known about her except that she met Paul back in high school. She and her daughter are attacked in their apartment by three men, and Esther is beaten to death.
Carol Benjamin Tobey – Paul and Esther's 23-year-old daughter and wife of lawyer Jack Tobey. After the beating from the muggers, her mental state deteriorates and the book ends with her being institutionalized.
Jack Tobey – Paul's son-in-law who works as a defense attorney. In contrast to his father-in-law, Jack is pragmatic, arguing against vigilantism and trying to convince Paul that he should just find a way to live with Esther's death.
Sam Kreutzer – Paul's best friend at work.
Adele Kreutzer – Sam's wife.
Henry Ives – Paul's boss, who sends him to Arizona.
Bill Dundee – An accountant who works in Paul's office and often spouts right-wing views.
George Eng – An Asian-American businessman and client of Paul's.
John Childress – One of Paul's co-workers.
Lieutenant Malcolm Briggs – The apathetic lead investigator on Esther and Carol's case. 
Inspector Frank Ochoa – The detective who leads the investigation into Paul's activities as the "vigilante"
Officer Joe Charles – A patrolman who informs Paul of Esther's murder.
Ira Nermserman – One of Paul's clients.
Thomas Leroy Marston – A heroin junkie and the first criminal Paul murders as the vigilante.
Ames Jainchill – A client of Paul's doing business with George Eng.
Shirley Mackenzie – A woman Paul has a one-night stand with in Tucson.

Film adaptations

A feature film based on the novel was made in 1974, starring Charles Bronson in the lead role as Paul Benjamin (the surname being changed to Kersey and profession being an architect) and directed by Michael Winner. A remake, starring Bruce Willis in the lead role (also named "Kersey" and profession being changed to surgeon) and directed by Eli Roth, was released in 2018.

1975 sequel novel

Garfield was so disappointed in the 1974 film adaption that he was inspired to write the book sequel Death Sentence the following year.

References

1972 American novels
American thriller novels
American novels adapted into films
Novels set in New York City
Death Wish (franchise)